Injection is an American comics ongoing series, created in 2015 by Warren Ellis and illustrated by Declan Shalvey  and Jordie Bellaire, who previously collaborated on Ellis's Moon Knight run for Marvel Comics. The comic is high-concept science fiction fused with elements of magic and mythology, and also invokes British literary and pop cultural archetypes, such as Bernard Quatermass, Sherlock Holmes, Doctor Who, James Bond and Carnacki. The series has been optioned for television by Universal Cable Productions.

Plot
A group of five highly specialized individuals are brought together by the British government to hypothesize about the future of human culture. Discovering the results, the group decide to act on it by creating an unusual artificial intelligence using a combination of technology and shamanistic magic, which makes its way into the world. The group, now disbanded, finds itself brought back together when the intelligence reemerges, creating specialized havoc that draws inspiration from mythology and superstition.

Collected editions

References

Image Comics titles
Comics by Warren Ellis